Wacław Leon Czarnecki (2 August 1902  – 16 May 1990) a Polish journalist, who before World War II was a member of the Polish Socialist Party; after World War II he was a member of the Society of Fighters for Freedom and Democracy (ZBoWiD) and the Society of Polish Journalists (Stowarzyszenie Dziennikarzy Polskich).

He was a prisoner of the Majdanek and Buchenwald Nazi concentration camps, an active member of secret communist and anti-fascist organisations in Buchenwald; he co-authored (with Zygmunt Zonik) monographs about the Buchenwald concentration camp (inspired by his Buchenwald friend Kazimierz Nowicki) and its sub-camp Mittelbau-Dora.

Wacław Czarnecki died in Warsaw. He is buried at the Służew Old Cemetery, left side, 2nd plot,  5th row, grave no 10.

Books

Notes

External links 
 Individual Files (male) – Concentration Camp Buchenwald: Wacław Czarnecki. Arolsen Archives Accessed 1 August 2019.

1902 births
1990 deaths
Buchenwald concentration camp survivors
Majdanek concentration camp survivors
20th-century Polish journalists